Half Moon Pond State Park, also known as Half Moon State Park, is a wooded campground state park located within the 3,576-acre Bomoseen State Park in the town of Hubbardton, Vermont. The campsites are located on Half Moon Pond.

Activities includes boating, swimming, camping, fishing, hiking, bicycling, picnicking, wildlife watching and winter sports.

The Glen Lake Trail connects the Half Moon campground (52 tent/RV sites, 5 cabins and 11 lean-to sites) with the Bomoseen campground (66 campsites including 10 lean-tos.

Facilities include two swim beaches, boat rentals, campsites, flush toilets, hot showers, and a dump station. Park rangers offer interpretive programs including night hikes, campfire programs, amphibian explorations, and nature crafts and games.

References

External links
Official website

State parks of Vermont
Protected areas of Rutland County, Vermont
Hubbardton, Vermont